Nadezhda Petrovna Azarova (born 18 September 1983),  Polivoda, is a Belarusian chess player who holds the FIDE title of Woman International Master (WIM, 2006).

Biography
In 2000s, Nadezhda Azarova was one of the leading Belarusian chess players. She won six medals in Belarusian Women's Chess Championships.

Azarova played for Belarus in the Women's Chess Olympiads:
 In 2006, at first board in the 37th Chess Olympiad (women) in Turin (+1, =2, -6),
 In 2008, at third board in the 38th Chess Olympiad (women) in Dresden (+5, =4, -0).

In 2006, she received the FIDE Woman International Master (WIM) title.

References

External links

1983 births
Chess players from Minsk
Living people
Belarusian female chess players
Chess Woman International Masters
Chess Olympiad competitors